Configuration or configurations may refer to:

Computing
 Computer configuration or system configuration
 Configuration file, a software file used to configure the initial settings for a computer program
 Configurator, also known as choice board, design system, or co-design platform, used in product design to capture customers' specifications
 Configure script ("./configure" in Unix), the output of Autotools; used to detect system configuration
 CONFIG.SYS, the primary configuration file for DOS and OS/2 operating systems

Mathematics
 Configuration (geometry), a finite set of points and lines with certain properties
 Configuration (polytope), special kind of configuration for regular polytopes
 Configuration space (mathematics), a space representing assignments of points to non-overlapping positions on a topological space

Physics
 Configuration space (physics), in classical mechanics, the vector space formed by the parameters of a system
 Electron configuration, the distribution of electrons of an atom or molecule
 Molecular configuration, the permanent geometry that results from the spatial arrangement of molecular bonds
 Configuron, a quasiparticle

Other uses
 Configuration (locomotive parts), denoting the number of leading, driving, and trailing axles on a locomotive
 Configuration management, a systems engineering quality control process 
 Configurational analysis, a method of studying human behaviour.
 Configurations (journal),  an academic journal established in 1993 by the Society for Literature, Science, and the Arts

See also